SVM (Silicon Valley Microelectronics, Inc.) is a privately held California corporation which provides silicon wafers and services to the semiconductor and solar industries. SVM sells a variety of wafer diameters, including 100mm, 200mm, and 300mm Prime and Test device quality wafers. The company not only handles silicon, but also specialty materials such as gallium arsenide, indium phosphide, Silicon on Insulator and silicon carbide. SVM offers grinding, polishing, film deposition, and other related wafer processing services as well. Owner and President Patrick Callinan founded SVM in 1990.

Awards 

On July 2, 2009, SVM was awarded an Energy Innovator Award by Silicon Valley Power (SVP). The award was presented to SVM's President, Patrick Callinan by Santa Clara Mayor Patricia Mahan at the Silicon Valley Energy Summit held at Stanford University. The Summit, co-sponsored by Stanford's Precourt Energy Efficiency Center hosted keynote speaker Former Secretary of State Condoleezza Rice.

References

External links 
 Silicon Valley Microelectronics

Companies based in Santa Clara, California
American companies established in 1990
Silicon wafer producers
Electronics companies established in 1990